David Silva (born 1986) is a Spanish footballer.

David Silva may also refer to:

David Mendes da Silva (born 1982), Dutch football defensive midfielder
David Silva (actor) (1917–1976), Mexican film actor
David Silva (linguist) (born 1964), American linguist and academic administrator
David Silva (footballer, born October 1986) (born 1986), Portuguese-born Cape Verdean football winger
David Silva (footballer, born December 1986) (born 1986), Colombian football midfielder
David Silva Fernandes (born 1986), Brazilian football defender